Písečná is a municipality and village in Ústí nad Orlicí District in the Pardubice Region of the Czech Republic. It has about 600 inhabitants. Písečná lies on the stream Potočnice.

History
The first written mention of Písečná is from 1364. Existence of a wooden church is documented in 1350.

References

External links

Villages in Ústí nad Orlicí District